Santa Clara County, officially the County of Santa Clara, is the sixth-most populous county in the U.S. state of California, with a population of 1,936,259, as of the 2020 census. Santa Clara County and neighboring San Benito County together form the U.S. Census Bureau's San Jose-Sunnyvale-Santa Clara metropolitan statistical area, which is part of the larger San Jose-San Francisco-Oakland combined statistical area. Santa Clara is the most populous county in the San Francisco Bay Area and in Northern California. The county seat and largest city is San Jose; with about 1,000,000 residents, it is the 10th-most populous city in the United States, California's third-most populous city and the most populous city in the San Francisco Bay Area. The second- and third-largest cities are Sunnyvale and Santa Clara.

Home to Silicon Valley, Santa Clara County is an economic center for high technology, and in 2015 had the third-highest gross domestic product (GDP) per capita in the world (after Zürich, Switzerland and Oslo, Norway), according to the Brookings Institution. Located on the southern coast of San Francisco Bay, the urbanized Santa Clara Valley within Santa Clara County contains most of the county's population. More recently, extensive droughts in California, further complicated by drainage of the Anderson reservoir within the county for seismic repairs, have strained the county's water security.

The county's concentration of wealth, primarily due to the tech industry, has made it the most affluent county on the West Coast of the United States and the most affluent outside the Washington metropolitan area and one of the most affluent places in the United States.

Etymology

Santa Clara County is named for Mission Santa Clara, which was established in 1777, and was in turn named for Saint Clare of Assisi.

History

Santa Clara County was one of the original counties of California, formed in 1850 at the time of statehood. The original inhabitants included the Ohlone, residing on Coyote Creek and Calaveras Creek. Part of the county's territory was given to Alameda County in 1853.

In 1882, Santa Clara County tried to levy taxes upon property of the Southern Pacific Railroad within county boundaries. The result was the U.S. Supreme Court case of Santa Clara County v. Southern Pacific Railroad, 118 U.S. 394 (1886), in which the court extended due-process rights to artificial legal entities.

In the early 20th century, the area was promoted as the "Valley of the Heart's Delight" due to its natural beauty, including a significant number of orchards.

The first major technology company to be based in the area was Hewlett-Packard, founded in a garage in Palo Alto in 1939. IBM selected San Jose as its West Coast headquarters in 1943. Varian Associates, Fairchild Semiconductor, and other early innovators were in the county by the late 1940s and 1950s. The U.S. Navy had a large presence in the area and began giving large contracts to Silicon Valley electronics companies. The term "Silicon Valley" was coined in 1971. The trend accelerated in the 1980s and 1990s, and agriculture has since been nearly eliminated from the northern part of the county.

Today, Santa Clara County is the headquarters for about 6500 high-technology companies, including many of the largest ones in the world, among them hardware manufacturers AMD, Nvidia, Cisco Systems, and Intel, computer and consumer electronics companies Apple Inc. and Hewlett-Packard, and internet companies eBay, Google, and Yahoo!. Most of what is considered to be Silicon Valley is within the county, although some adjoining tech regions in San Mateo (e.g., Facebook), Alameda, and Santa Cruz counties are also considered part of Silicon Valley.

Geography

Counties which border with Santa Clara County are, clockwise, Alameda County, San Joaquin (within a few hundred feet at Mount Boardman), Stanislaus, Merced, San Benito, Santa Cruz, and San Mateo County. Santa Clara County formerly shared borders with Contra Costa, San Francisco, Mariposa, Monterey, and Tuolumne counties until 1853, 1856, 1874, and 1854 respectively (Monterey County currently comes within a few miles of Santa Clara).

The San Andreas Fault runs along the Santa Cruz Mountains in the south and west of the county.

National protected area
 Don Edwards San Francisco Bay National Wildlife Refuge (part)

Fauna

Both tule elk (Cervus canadensis nannodes) and pronghorn (Antilocapra americana) were historically native to Santa Clara County. In June 1776, Lieutenant Commander Don José Joaquín Moraga led a group of soldiers and colonists from the Presidio of Monterey to establish Mission San Francisco de Asis and encountered both tule elk and pronghorn, and clearly distinguished these two species from deer. The deer in California being California mule deer (Odocoileus hemionus).

Regarding elk, Moraga wrote: "In the great plain called San Bernardino (the Santa Clara Valley which stretches from south San Jose to Gilroy), while the expedition was strung out at length, we descried in the distance a herd of large animals that looked like cattle, but we could not imagine where they belonged or from whence they had come...with horns similar in shape to those of the deer, but so large that they measured sixteen palms from tip to tip." Upon measurement, Morago reported the elk horns as four varas [11 feet] across… "These animals [elk] are called ciervos in order to differentiate them from the ordinary Spanish variety of deer, here called venados, which also exist in abundance and of large size in the vicinity."

Regarding pronghorn, Moraga reported: "In the said plains of San Bernardino (Santa Clara Valley)…there is another species of deer about the size of three-year-old sheep. They are similar in appearance to the deer, except they have short horns and also short legs like the sheep. They live in the plains where they go in herds of 100, 200, or more. They run all together over the plains so fast that they seem to fly…These animals are called berrendos and there are many of them also in the southern Missions wherever the country is level."

Herbert Eugene Bolton also wrote of elk reports from another Spanish expedition, from the De Anza Expedition on March 23, 1776: " In Gilroy Valley (Santa Clara Valley) Moraga 's larder was replenished by three elks which the men killed without leaving the road." General John Bidwell, of the 1841 Bartleson-Bidwell Party wrote: "In some of the fertile valleys, such as Napa and Santa Clara, there were elk literally by the thousand."

In 1978, California Department of Fish and Game warden Henry Coletto urged the department to choose the Mount Hamilton area as one of California's relocation sites under a new statewide effort to restore tule elk. While other ranchers refused, tech pioneers Bill Hewlett and David Packard allowed Coletto and state biologists to translocate the initial 32 tule elk from the Owens Valley in the eastern Sierra onto the  San Felipe Ranch, which the families jointly own, in the hills east of Morgan Hill. From the three original 1978–1981 translocations (totaling 65 animals) to the Mount Hamilton region of the Diablo Range, there are multiple herds in different locations including the Isabel Valley, San Antonio Valley, Livermore area, San Felipe Ranch, Metcalf Canyon, Coyote Ridge, Anderson Lake, and surrounding areas such as the Sunol and Cottonwood Creek (near San Luis Reservoir in western Merced County, California) herds.  , an estimated 400 tule elk roam  in northeastern Santa Clara County and southeastern Alameda County. In March 2014 CDFW translocated nine bull elk from the San Luis National Wildlife Refuge to add genetic diversity to the San Antonio Valley Ecological Reserve herd in San Antonio Valley in extreme eastern Santa Clara County. As of 2017 there were four herds in the Coyote Ridge area, often visible from U. S. Highway 101, according to Craige Edgerton, recently retired executive director of the Silicon Valley Land Conservancy and local naturalist Michael Hundt. In 2019, a fifth herd of tule elk was documented by local naturalist Roger Castillo, likely having split from the Coyote Ridge herd and established itself in Silver Creek Valley around the closed Ranch Golf Club. The elk herds in eastern Santa Clara County are blocked from dispersal to the west by U.S. Highway 101, with environmentalists advocating re-purposing the Metcalf Road bridge at the Coyote Gap into a wildlife overcrossing. This would enable elk to recolonize rural southwestern Santa Clara County, as well as Santa Cruz and San Mateo Counties.

In 1990, the California Department of Fish and Game's Henry Coletto translocated excess pronghorn from Modoc County to six locations in California, including 51 animals to the San Felipe Ranch in Santa Clara County, where the swift-footed ungulates had not lived for generations. The animals left the San Felipe Ranch for the Isabel and San Antonio Valleys, as well as an area near Lake Del Valle in Alameda County may now be extirpated by poaching, highway vehicle collisions, and insufficient numbers to defend pronghorn fawns against coyote predation. As of 2012, the Isabel Valley Ranch herd had dwindled to 3 animals, and the Lake del Valle herd to 13. Currently, iNaturalist.org has zero observer records of pronghorn in Santa Clara County.

The Nature Conservancy "Mount Hamilton Project" has acquired or put under conservation easement  of land towards its  goal for habitat conservation within a  area encompassing much of eastern Santa Clara County as well as portions of southern Alameda County, western Merced and Stanislaus Counties, and northern San Benito County. Acquisitions to date include the  Rancho Cañada de Pala, straddling the Alameda Creek and Coyote Creek watersheds for California tiger salamander habitat; a conservation easement on the 3,259-acre Blue Oak Ranch Reserve, which abuts the north side of Joseph D. Grant County Park; a conservation easement on the 28,359-acre San Felipe Ranch, connecting Joseph D. Grant County Park with Henry W. Coe State Park; the 2,899-acre South Valley Ranch which protects a tule elk herd in the San Antonio Valley, and other properties.

As of 1980, Santa Clara County had the highest number of Superfund Sites of any county in the United States, accounting for 25 polluted locations requiring a long-term response to clean up hazardous material contaminations. , Santa Clara County has 23 active Superfund Sites, still more than any other county in the United States. The vast majority of these Superfund sites were caused by firms associated with the high tech sector in Silicon Valley.

Demographics

2020 census

Note: the US Census treats Hispanic/Latino as an ethnic category. This table excludes Latinos from the racial categories and assigns them to a separate category. Hispanics/Latinos can be of any race.

2018 
Census demographics data released in 2019 show Asian Americans have had the plurality of Santa Clara's population since 2014.

2011–2014 

As of 2013, Santa Clara County has the highest median household income of any county in California at $84,741.

Places by population, race, and income

2010 census
The 2010 United States census reported that Santa Clara County had a population of 1,781,642. The racial makeup of Santa Clara County was 836,616 (47.0%) White, 46,428 (2.6%) African American, 12,960 (0.7%) Native American, 7,060 (0.4%) Pacific Islander, 570,524 (32.0%) Asian, 220,806 (12.4%) from other races, and 87,248 (4.9%) from two or more races. Hispanics or Latinos of any race were 479,210 persons (26.9% of the population).

Demographic profile
 The largest ancestry groups were:

22.5% Mexican
8.6% Chinese
8.2% German
7.1% Vietnamese
6.6% Indian
6.0% English
6.0% Irish
4.9% Filipino
4.6% Italian
2.0% French
1.6% Portuguese
1.6% Korean
1.4% American
1.4% Japanese
1.4% Scottish
1.2% Polish
1.2% Swedish
1.1% Russian
1.1% Norwegian
1.0% Dutch

2000
As of the census of 2000, 1,682,585 people, 565,863 households, and 395,538 families were residing in the county. The population density was 503/km2 (1,304/mi2). The 579,329 housing units had an average density of 173/km2 (449/sq mi). The ethnic makeup of the county was 53.8% White, 2.8% African American, 0.7% Native American, 25.6% Asian, 0.3% Pacific Islander, 12.1% from other races, and 4.7% from two or more races. About 24.0% of the population were Hispanic or Latino of any race.

Of the 565,863 households, 34.9% had children under 18 living with them, 54.9% were married couples living together, 10.0% had a female householder with no husband present, and 30.1% were not families. About 21.4% of all households were made up of individuals, and 5.9% had someone living alone who was 65 or older. The average household size was 2.92, and the average family size was 3.41.

In the county, the age distribution was 24.7% under 18, 9.3% from 18 to 24, 35.4% from 25 to 44, 21.0% from 45 to 64, and 9.5% who were 65 or older. The median age was 34 years. For every 100 females,there were 102.80 males. For every 100 females 18 and over, there were 101.90 males.

The median income for a household in the county was $74,335, and for a family was $81,717. Males had a median income of $56,240 versus $40,574 for females. The per capita income for the county was $32,795. About 4.9% of families and 7.5% of the population were below the poverty line, including 8.4% of those under age 18 and 6.4% of those age 65 or over.

2020 religion census

Santa Clara County is among the most religiously diverse counties in the US. A 2020 census by the Public Religion Research Institute (unconnected to the official US census) calculates a religious diversity score of 0.876 for Santa Clara County, where 1 represents complete diversity (each religious group of equal size) and 0 a total lack of diversity. Only four counties in the US have higher diversity scores than Santa Clara County.

Government
Santa Clara County has five elected supervisors, elected within their districts.

The county is one among three counties in California (with Napa and Madera) to establish a separate department, the Santa Clara County Department of Corrections, to deal with corrections pursuant to California Government Code §23013.

The county operates the Santa Clara County Health System of medical centers and clinics.

The county also pays the $340,000 salary and benefits of the California state Department of Social Services director, which is reimbursed by the state, skirting the $165,000 state law cap for the position.

In the United States House of Representatives, Santa Clara County is split among 4 congressional districts:
 ,
 ,
 , and
 .

In the California State Senate, the county is split among 4 legislative districts:
 ,
 ,
 , and
 .

In the California State Assembly, the county is split among 6 legislative districts:
 ,
 ,
 ,
 ,
 , and
 ,

Voters in the county also elect a number of other officials to county-wide positions, including the Santa Clara County District Attorney, the Santa Clara County Sheriff, and a large number of criminal and civil judges that serve in courts throughout the county.

Politics
Historically, Santa Clara County was a Republican stronghold in presidential elections. From 1872 through 1984, the only Democrats to carry Santa Clara County were Franklin Roosevelt, Lyndon Johnson, and Hubert Humphrey. However, 1988 would begin to mark a significant shift in the county's political leanings, starting with Michael Dukakis' narrow win and culminating in Bill Clinton's substantial 20-point victory in 1992. Since then, the Democratic presidential candidate has won Santa Clara County by large margins, and also remains solidly blue in congressional elections, as all politicians representing the county at the state and federal level are known to be Democrats . The last Republican to win a majority in the county was Ronald Reagan in 1984. While Republicans remained competitive at the state and local level throughout the 1990s, there are currently no elected Republicans representing the county above the local level.

  
 
  

 

  

 
  

 

 

  
 

According to the California Secretary of State, as of February 10, 2019, Santa Clara County has 895,965 registered voters. Of those, 405,470 (45.3%) are registered Democrats, 151,213 (16.9%) are registered Republicans, and 308,769 (35.4%) have declined to state a political party.

As of November 2012, all of the cities, towns, and the unincorporated areas of Santa Clara County have more registered Democrats than Republicans.  In the 2008 US Presidential Election, Democratic nominee Barack Obama carried every city and town in the county, as well as the unincorporated areas.

Following the passage of Proposition 8, Santa Clara County joined San Francisco and Los Angeles in a lawsuit, becoming, along with San Francisco and Los Angeles, the first governmental entities in the world to sue for same-sex marriage.

Voter registration

Cities by population and voter registration

Crime 

The following table includes the number of incidents reported in 2009 and the rate per 1,000 persons for each type of offense. Law Enforcement in Santa Clara County is handled by the Santa Clara County Sheriff's Office and local police departments.

Cities by population and crime rates

Economy
The county's economy is heavily services-based. Technology, both hardware and software, dominates the service sector by value, but like any other county, Santa Clara has its share of retail and office support workers.

The San Jose/Sunnyvale/Santa Clara metropolitan region, comprising Santa Clara County and San Benito County, was ranked as the highest performing metropolitan area in the US in 2012, ahead of Austin, Texas and Raleigh, North Carolina, according to the Milken Institute.  The GDP of the metro area reached $176.7 billion in 2011, or $94,587 per capita, roughly on par with Qatar in both total GDP and per capita (nominal). GDP grew a strong 7.7% in 2011, and in contrast with most of California, GDP and per capita GDP (nominal) is well above 2007 (financial crisis) levels. Despite relative wealth vis a vis other regions nationally, a large underclass exists whose income is roughly equivalent to that elsewhere in the country, despite extreme land prices. The surge in metro GDP is highly correlated with home prices, which for average single-family homes passed $1 million ($1,017,528) in August 2013. As of the fourth quarter of 2021, the median value of homes in Santa Clara County was $1,253,400, an increase of 11.9% from the prior year, and ranking fourth in the US for highest median home value.

Education

K-12 schools
School districts include:

 Unified

 Gilroy Unified School District
 Milpitas Unified School District
 Morgan Hill Unified School District
 Palo Alto Unified School District
 Patterson Joint Unified School District
 San Jose Unified School District
 Santa Clara Unified School District

 Secondary

 Campbell Union High School District
 East Side Union High School District
 Fremont Union High School District
 Los Gatos-Saratoga Joint Union High School District
 Mountain View–Los Altos Union High School District

 Elementary

 Alum Rock Union Elementary School District
 Berryessa Union Elementary School District
 Cambrian Elementary School District
 Campbell Union Elementary School District
 Cupertino Union Elementary School District
 Evergreen Elementary School District
 Franklin-McKinley Elementary School District
 Lakeside Joint Elementary School District
 Loma Prieta Joint Union Elementary School District
 Los Altos Elementary School District
 Los Gatos Union Elementary School District
 Luther Burbank Elementary School District
 Moreland School District
 Mountain View Whisman Elementary School District
 Mount Pleasant Elementary School District
 Oak Grove Elementary School District
 Orchard Elementary School District
 Saratoga Union Elementary School District
 Sunnyvale Elementary School District
 Union School District

 Defunct
 Montebello Elementary School District

Libraries
Santa Clara County Library is a public library system serving the communities and cities of Campbell, Cupertino, Gilroy, Los Altos, Los Altos Hills, Milpitas, Monte Sereno, Morgan Hill, Saratoga, and all unincorporated areas of the county. Other cities run their own library systems.

Transportation

Air

The county's main airport is Norman Y. Mineta San José International Airport (SJC). It is a U.S. Customs and Border Protection port of entry and as of 2019 has five international routes (two to Canada, one to England, one to Japan, seven to Mexico, and one to China) but the airport's busiest routes are all to cities in the western United States. San Francisco International Airport (SFO) is also often used for commercial services by residents of Santa Clara County.

Moffett Federal Airfield (NUQ), a former U.S. Naval Air Station, is used by the Air National Guard, NASA, Lockheed Martin, Google, and by the San Jose Police and Santa Clara County Sheriff's Department as an air operations base. There are also smaller general aviation airports in Palo Alto (PAO), San Jose (Reid-Hillview) (RHV), and San Martin(E16)

Rail

Santa Clara County is served by Caltrain commuter rail from Gilroy through San Jose and Silicon Valley north to San Francisco Airport and San Francisco. The Santa Clara Valley Transportation Authority operates the VTA light rail system, which primarily serves San Jose, with one line continuing as far north as Mountain View. Santa Clara and San Jose are also served by the Altamont Corridor Express commuter rail line which provides services to Stockton, and Amtrak which provides service to Sacramento and Oakland. The Amtrak Coast Starlight train between Seattle and Los Angeles also stops in San Jose. BART currently services Milpitas and North San Jose, with plans to extend to downtown San Jose and Santa Clara.

Road

Buses
Santa Clara County has consolidated its transportation services into the Santa Clara Valley Transportation Authority, which operates a bus system.

Bicycle network
The Santa Clara Valley Transportation Authority is establishing a bicycle network throughout the county. Santa Clara County Bicycle network is part of the San Francisco Bay Area Regional Bikeway Network.
 Bikeways Map (Effective April 2011)
 Regional Bicycle Plan for the San Francisco Bay Area 2009 Update

Freeways and expressways
The county has an extensive freeway system and a separate expressway system (though it's not as extensive as those in Southern California). Expressways in California are distinct from freeways; although access to adjoining properties is eliminated, at-grade intersections are allowed. However, unlike expressways virtually everywhere else in California, the Santa Clara County expressways were built, signed, and maintained as county roads; they are not maintained by Caltrans, although they are patrolled by the California Highway Patrol.

There is also a large street network dominated by four- and six-lane arterials. Some of the newer boulevards (primarily in the West Valley) are divided with landscaped medians.

Major highways

  Interstate 280
  Interstate 680
  Interstate 880
  U.S. Route 101
  State Route 9
  State Route 17
  State Route 25
  State Route 35
  State Route 82
  State Route 85
  State Route 87
  State Route 130
  State Route 152
  State Route 156
  State Route 237

County routes

 Santa Clara County expressway system
  County Route G2—Lawrence Expressway
  County Route G3—Page Mill Road/Oregon Expressway
  County Route G4—San Tomas Expressway/Montague Expressway
  County Route G5—Foothill Expressway
  County Route G6—Central Expressway
  County Route G7—Bloomfield Avenue
  County Route G8—Almaden Expressway
  County Route G9—Leavesly Road/Ferguson Road
  County Route G10—Blossom Hill Road
  County Route G21—Capitol Expressway

Other roads
 The Alameda

Sea
The county has no commercial seaports, although small boats can access San Francisco Bay from several points. Like many other Bay Area counties, it is dependent upon the Port of Oakland for transport of ocean cargo.

Jails
Santa Clara County Department of Correction is administered by the county's sheriff's office and supervises the following facilities:
 Santa Clara County Main Jail
 Main Jail South (up to 674 men)
 Main Jail North (up to 919 men)
 Elmwood Correctional Facility (up to 600 women, 2,500 men)
 North County Jail (day use only for Palo Alto courthouse)
 Juvenile Detention
 Santa Clara County Juvenile Hall (up to 390 boys and girls)
 William F. James Boys Ranch (up to 96 teenage boys)

Parks

Santa Clara County has an extensive park system, much of it founded in the major park expansion of the late 1970s. Parks within the county include:
 Almaden Quicksilver County Park
 Grant Ranch Park
 Henry W. Coe State Park
 Sanborn Park
 Vasona Park
Open space preserves include:
 El Sereno Open Space Preserve

Santa Clara County also contains Ulistac Natural Area, a volunteer maintained natural open space. Foreign and invasive species are removed when possible as native plants are introduced. Migratory birds and butterflies often use this area.

Climate

Sister counties
To promote friendship and understanding and to build bridges with countries of origin for various ethnic populations in the county, the County of Santa Clara has created a Sister County Commission to coordinate the program. As of 2009, there are three sister counties:
  Province of Florence, Italy
  Moscow Area, Russia
  Hsinchu County, Taiwan (Republic of China)

Communities

Cities
There are 15 incorporated places in Santa Clara County:

 Campbell
 Cupertino
 Gilroy
 Los Altos
 Milpitas
 Monte Sereno
 Morgan Hill
 Mountain View
 Palo Alto
 San Jose (county seat)
 Santa Clara
 Saratoga
 Sunnyvale

Towns 

 Los Altos Hills
 Los Gatos

Census-designated places

 Alum Rock
 Burbank
 Cambrian Park
 East Foothills
 Fruitdale
 Lexington Hills
 Loyola also known as Loyola Corners
 San Martin
 Stanford

Unincorporated communities

 Bell Station, also known as Bell's Station and Hollenbeck's Station
 Casa Loma
 Chemeketa Park
 Coyote, also known as Burnett c. 1860–1882
 East San Jose
 Llagas-Uvas
 Madrone, now part of Morgan Hill
 Redwood Estates
 Rucker
 San Antonio, also known as Deforest c. 1892–1924
 Sveadal

Census county divisions
 Diablo Range
 Llagas–Uvas
 South Santa Clara Valley
 West Santa Clara

Former townships
 Almaden Township: Present-day Almaden Valley, Cambrian Park and portions of Campbell and Los Gatos.
 Alviso Township: Present-day Alviso.
 Burnett Township: Present-day Coyote, Santa Teresa and Morgan Hill.
 Fremont Township: Present-day Palo Alto, Sunnyvale, Mountain View, Los Altos, Los Altos Hills and part of Cupertino.
 Gilroy Township: Present-day Gilroy and San Martin.
 Milpitas Township: Present-day Milpitas.
 Redwood Township: Present-day Los Gatos, Monte Sereno, Saratoga, Redwood Estates and portions of Cupertino and Campbell.
 San Jose Township: Most of present-day San Jose.
 Santa Clara Township: Present-day Santa Clara and portions of San Jose, Cupertino and Campbell.

Population ranking

The population ranking of the following table is based on the 2020 census of Santa Clara County.

† county seat

See also

 List of attractions in Silicon Valley
 List of school districts in Santa Clara County, California
 National Register of Historic Places listings in Santa Clara County, California
 Santa Clara County expressway system
 Santa Clara County Health System
 Santa Clara County Federal Credit Union
 Santa Clara Valley
 Second Harvest of Silicon Valley

Notes

References

External links
 
 Santa Clara County governmental committee agendas
 Santa Clara County Planning Office
 Santa Clara Valley Water District - Drinking Water
 List of special districts in Santa Clara County (LAFCo)
 Santa Clara County Library 
 Santa Clara County: California's Historic Silicon Valley, a National Park Service Discover Our Shared Heritage Travel Itinerary

 
California counties
Counties in the San Francisco Bay Area
Silicon Valley
1850 establishments in California
Populated places established in 1850
Majority-minority counties in California